ASV Durlach is a German association football club from the borough of Durlach in the city of Karlsruhe, Baden-Württemberg.



History
The club was established on 14 May 1902 as Fußball Club Germania Durlach. During World War II they were briefly partnered with Fußball Club Phönix Karlsruhe and played from 1943 to 1945 as Kriegspielgemainschaft Karlsruhe. Following the war occupying Allied authorities ordered the dissolution of most organizations, including sports and football clubs. ASV was re-established on 1 June 1946, and in addition to their former membership, included the memberships of VfR Durlach, Turnerschaft Durlach, and TG Durlach. The following year they were joined by Tennisclub Durlach.

Throughout the early existence of the association, the footballers played as an unheralded local side in lower-tier competition. ASV fielded competitive sides in the third division Amateurliga Nordbaden in four seasons from 1946 to 1950, earning a second-place finish in 1948, and top four finishes in each of the other seasons. Durlach advanced to the 2. Liga-Süd where they played until 1955 when they were relegated back to Amateurliga play. They struggled through four seasons there until again being demoted. They made a brief two season re-appearance in the Amateurliga Nordbaden (III) in 1965–67.

After promotion to the Verbandsliga Nordbaden in 1988, ASV enjoyed its most recent turn in upper-level football in the Oberliga Baden-Württemberg (IV) between 1993 and 1997 and again in the 2005–06 season, where they earned lower table results in five campaigns. In 2007–08, a Verbandsliga championship returned the club to the Oberliga, where it played until 2011, when it was relegated once more. In 2013 it suffered another relegation, now to the Landesliga, but won a league championship there in 2015 and returned to the Verbandsliga.

Honors
The club's honours:

League
 Verbandsliga Nordbaden (V)
 Champions: 1993, 2005, 2008
 Landesliga Mittelbaden
 Champions: 2015
 Runners-up: 2014

Cup
 North Baden Cup
 Winners: 2008

Recent managers
Recent managers of the club:

Recent seasons

The recent season-by-season performance of the club:

 With the introduction of the Regionalligas in 1994 and the 3. Liga in 2008 as the new third tier, below the 2. Bundesliga, all leagues below dropped one tier.

References

External links
Official team site
ASV Durlach profile at Weltfussball.de
Das deutsche Fußball-Archiv historical German domestic league tables 

Football clubs in Germany
Football clubs in Baden-Württemberg
Association football clubs established in 1902
1902 establishments in Germany
Sport in Karlsruhe